Anna Magdalena Iljans, née Jonsson (born September 26, 1969) is a Swedish freestyle skier, specializing in ski cross.

Iljans competed at the 2010 Winter Olympics for Sweden. She placed 11th in the qualifying round in ski cross, to advance to the knockout stages. She finished second in her first round heat, advancing to the quarterfinals. She did not finish her quarterfinal race, failing to advance. She tragically had to end her career because of injuries and is now working as a school principal.

As of April 2013, Iljans has one medal finish at the World Championships. She won a silver medal, in 2005, the first World Championships at which ski cross was contested. She qualified third overall, then won both her first round and semifinal races, before finishing behind Karin Huttary in the final.

Iljans made her World Cup debut in November 2002. As of April 2013, she has seven World Cup victories, the first coming in her debut race at Tignes in 2002/03. Her best World Cup overall finish in ski cross is 2nd, in 2002/03 and 2006/07.

World Cup Podiums
7 wins, 13 podiums

References

External links
 
 

1969 births
Living people
Olympic freestyle skiers of Sweden
Freestyle skiers at the 2010 Winter Olympics
People from Upplands-Bro Municipality
Swedish female freestyle skiers
Sportspeople from Stockholm County